Peter Mark Pruzan (born 1936 in the United States) is a Danish organizational theorist, management consultant, and Emeritus Professor of Systems Science at the Department of Management, Politics & Philosophy at the Copenhagen Business School (CBS) in Denmark. Pruzan is known for work on corporate governance and values-based leadership. He became a naturalized Danish citizen in 1973.

Education and career 
Pruzan obtained his BA cum laude in 1957 from Princeton University, his MBA with Distinction in 1959 from Harvard University, his PhD in 1964 from Case Western Reserve University, and an advanced post-doctoral degree in Economics in 1982 from the University of Copenhagen.

In the early 1960s, Pruzan started his career as adviser to IBM Denmark on Operations Research and as a management consultant in Denmark and Sweden. In 1964 he was appointed Associate Professor at the Institute of Mathematical Statistics and Operations Research, Technical University of Denmark.

In 1967, he co-founded and led OAC, Operations Analysis Corp., an international consultancy specializing in Operations Research and in 1971 he co-founded SimCorp (currently listed on the NASDAQ OMX Nordic Exchange) that provides specialized software and financial expertise for the investment management industry; he no longer has any connection with or financial interest in the company. In 1976 he returned to academia as Associate Professor of Economic Planning at the University of Copenhagen.

From 1985 to 2003, he was Professor of Systems Science at the Copenhagen Business School where he was co-founder of the Department of Management, Politics and Philosophy as well as of bachelors and masters programs in Philosophy and Economics and in Mathematics and Economics. His research focus while at CBS was to integrate perspectives from management, philosophy, and spirituality to develop values-based approaches to leadership and ethics.

Among his organizational initiatives while at CBS were co-founding and designing the think tank and advisory services firm AccountAbility (London, 1995); CBS’s Center for Corporate Social Responsibility (2002) and the Academy of Business in Society (Bruxelles, 2002). Since his retirement in 2003, he has taught Research Methodology to PhD students in India and lectured internationally on spiritual-based leadership.

He has authored 15 books and roughly 150 articles in international scientific journals as well as lectured frequently in Europe, the US, and India, originally on operations research and then on values in the workplace, organizational ethics, social and ethical accounting, and corporate responsibility and, since the turn of the century, focusing mainly on spiritual-based leadership.

Publications

Selected books

Selected articles

References

External links 
 Peter Pruzan at the Copenhagen Business School

1937 births
Living people
Danish business theorists
Princeton University alumni
Harvard Business School alumni
Case Western Reserve University alumni
University of Copenhagen alumni
Academic staff of Copenhagen Business School